Kelvin Deaker (born 19 October 1965) is a former New Zealand rugby union international referee and  member of the Hawke's Bay Rugby Union, who has now retired from all refereeing. Deaker took up refereeing in 1991, and refereed his first representative match in 1996, when he took charge of a National Provincial Championship Division 3 match between Buller and Horowhenua. In 2001, the year he turned professional, Deaker refereed his first international rugby match, taking charge of the match between Wales and Japan on 17 June 2001. Two years later, Deaker was named as one of the referees who were to take charge of matches at the 2003 Rugby World Cup, and was subsequently named as a touch judge for the 2007 Rugby World Cup in France. Off the field, Deaker is a qualified chartered accountant, currently works for Taylor Pass Honey Co, in the town of Blenheim, New Zealand.

Career stats
National Referee Squad debut – 1996
Rebel Sport Super Rugby debut – 2000
Test debut - 2001
Total First Class Fixtures - 178 matches
Test Fixtures - 23 tests
Rebel Sport Super Rugby Fixtures - 41
Air New Zealand Cup/NPC - 72 matches
AA Rewards Heartland Championship - 19 matches

External links
2003 Rugby World Cup profile

References

1965 births
Living people
People from Otago
New Zealand rugby union referees
Rugby World Cup referees
Super Rugby referees
Six Nations Championship referees